József Farkas may refer to:

 József Farkas (politician) (1857–1951), Hungarian politician
 József Farkas (table tennis), Hungarian table tennis player
 József Farkas (footballer), Hungarian footballer in the 1996–97 UEFA Cup
 József Farkas (handballer), Hungarian former member of SC Pick Szeged
 József Farkas (wrestler), Hungarian wrestler